John E. Wissler is a United States Marine Corps lieutenant general who served as commander of United States Marine Corps Forces Command. He previously served as commanding general, III MEF.

Military service
Since his commissioning in 1978, he has served in a variety of command and staff billets, including his participation in Operation Iraqi Freedom. Presently in Syria Freedom (OPF)].

References

Living people
Year of birth missing (living people)
United States Marine Corps generals